Blue Cheer was an American rock band that initially performed and recorded in the late 1960s and early 1970s and was sporadically active until 2009. Based in San Francisco, Blue Cheer played in a psychedelic blues rock or acid rock style, and are also credited as being some of the earliest pioneers of heavy metal, with their cover of "Summertime Blues" sometimes cited as the first in the genre. They have also been noted as influential in the development of genres as disparate as punk rock, stoner rock, doom metal, experimental rock, and grunge.

History

Main career (1966–1969)
Blue Cheer were formed in 1966 by Dickie Peterson. Peterson had previously been with the Davis-based band Andrew Staples & The Oxford Circle along with future Blue Cheer members Paul Whaley and Gary Lee Yoder.  The original Blue Cheer personnel were singer/bassist Peterson, guitarist Leigh Stephens and Eric Albronda as drummer.  Albronda was later replaced by Whaley, who was joined by Peterson's brother Jerre (guitar), Vale Hamanaka (keyboards), and Jere Whiting (vocals, harmonica). Albronda continued his association with Blue Cheer as a member of Blue Cheer management, as well as being the producer or co-producer of five Blue Cheer albums.

The band was managed by an inactive member of the Hells Angels named Allen "Gut" Terk. Early on, it was decided that the line-up should be trimmed down.  It was said that Blue Cheer decided to adopt a power trio configuration after seeing Jimi Hendrix perform at the Monterey Pop Festival, but was later proven to be false. Hamanaka and Whiting were asked to leave. Jerre Peterson did not want to remain in the group without them, so he departed as well, leaving Peterson, Stephens and Whaley as a trio.

Their first hit was a cover version of Eddie Cochran's  "Summertime Blues"  from their debut album Vincebus Eruptum (1968). The single peaked at No. 14 on the Billboard Hot 100 chart, their only such hit, and the album peaked at No. 11 on the Billboard 200 chart. In Canada, the song peaked at No. 3 on the RPM Magazine chart.

The "Summertime Blues" single was backed with Dickie Peterson's original song "Out Of Focus". Peterson also contributed to the album the eight-minute "Doctor Please" and "Second Time Around", which features Paul Whaley's frantic drum solo. Filling out the record, the band cranked out blues covers "Rock Me Baby" (by B.B. King) and "Parchman Farm" (Mose Allison, but retitled "Parchment Farm").

The group underwent several personnel changes, the first occurring after the 1968 release of Outsideinside after Leigh Stephens left the band due to musical differences or, as some report, deafness. He was replaced by Randy Holden, formerly of Los Angeles garage rock band The Other Half. On 1969's New! Improved! there were different guitarists on side 1 and side 2 (Randy Holden and Bruce Stephens) due to Holden's unanticipated departure from the band. Following Holden's departure the band's line-up initially consisted of Dickie Peterson (bass), Tom Weisser (guitar), and Mitch Mitchell (drums), before Whaley returned and Bruce Stephens joined the band. Later, Ralph Burns Kellogg also joined the band on keyboards. Blue Cheer's style now changed to a more commercial hard rock sound à la Steppenwolf or Iron Butterfly.  By the fourth album Blue Cheer, Paul Whaley had left the band and had been replaced by Norman Mayell, and following the release of the fourth album Bruce Stephens also left the band and was succeeded by Gary Lee Yoder who helped complete the album.

According to Peterson, the group's lifestyle during this period caused problems with the music industry and press. Peterson said the group was outraged by the Vietnam War and society in general.

Reconfigurations, inactivity and first extended hiatus (1970s)
The new line-up of Peterson, Kellogg, Mayell and Yoder in 1970 saw the release of The Original Human Being, followed by 1971's Oh! Pleasant Hope. When Oh! Pleasant Hope failed to dent the sales charts, Blue Cheer temporarily split up in 1971.

There was a temporary resumption in 1974 with Peterson being joined by brother Jerre, Ruben De Fuentes (guitar) and Terry Rae (drums) for some tour dates. This grouping continued on briefly in 1975 with former Steppenwolf bassist Nick St. Nicholas replacing Peterson.  The group was then largely inactive for nearly three years, until 1978.

Peterson returned in 1978–79 with a fresh line-up of Tony Rainier on guitar and Mike Fleck on drums.  This version of the group went out on an American tour in 1979, primarily playing nightclubs. They played only material from the first two "heavy" Blue Cheer albums, opening their shows with "Summertime Blues".

Further reconfigurations, relocation to Germany, second and third extended hiatus (1980s–1998)
Blue Cheer was once again inactive in the early 1980s. There was another attempt to reunite in 1983, but that fell through. In 1984, Peterson had better luck when he returned with Whaley and Rainier as Blue Cheer and a brand new album The Beast Is Back, which was released on the New York label Megaforce Records. Whaley left again in 1985 as drummer Brent Harknett took over, only to be succeeded by Billy Carmassi in 1987. That same year, Dickie led yet another new lineup of the Cheer that had Ruben De Fuentes back on guitar and Eric Davis on drums. In 1988, the line-up changed once again, being now composed of Dickie Peterson (bass), with Andrew "Duck" MacDonald (guitar) and Dave Salce (drums).

From 1989 to 1993, Blue Cheer toured mainly in Europe. During this time, they played with classic rock acts as well as then-up-and-coming bands: Mountain, Outlaws, Thunder, The Groundhogs, Ten Years After, Mucky Pup, Biohazard and others.

1989 saw the release of Blue Cheer's first official live album, Blitzkrieg over Nüremberg. This album was recorded during Blue Cheer's first European tour in decades.

1990 saw the release of the Highlights and Lowlives studio album, composed of blues-based heavy metal and one ballad.  The album was co-produced by notable grunge producer Jack Endino and producer Roland Hofmann. The line-up was Peterson, Whaley on drums and MacDonald on guitars.

Blue Cheer followed up Highlights and Lowlives with the much heavier Dining with the Sharks. Duck MacDonald was replaced by German ex-Monsters guitar player Dieter Saller in 1990. Also featured is a special guest appearance by Groundhogs guitarist Tony McPhee. The album was co-produced by Roland Hofmann and Blue Cheer. Gary Holland (ex-Dokken/Great White/Britton replaced Whaley on drums in 1993.

In the early 1990s, Peterson and Whaley re-located to Germany. In 1992, Peterson recorded his first solo album, Child of the Darkness, in Cologne with a band named "The Scrap Yard". The album appeared five years later in Japan on Captain Trip Records. After Peterson came back to the U.S. in 1994, Blue Cheer was dormant from 1994 to 1999.

The return of Blue Cheer (1999–2009)
In 1999, Peterson and Whaley got together with guitarist MacDonald to resume touring as Blue Cheer. This band configuration remained largely constant from 1999 until Peterson's death in 2009.

In 2000, Blue Cheer was the subject of a tribute album, Blue Explosion – A Tribute to Blue Cheer, featuring such bands as Pentagram, Internal Void, Hogwash and Thumlock.

Peterson and Leigh Stephens were together once again in Blue Cheer with drummer Prairie Prince at the Chet Helms Memorial Tribal Stomp in San Francisco's Golden Gate Park on October 29, 2005, and their lively performance drew old rockers like Paul Kantner and others from backstage to observe. They did some recordings in Virginia in Winter 2005 with Joe Hasselvander of Raven and Pentagram on drums, due to Paul Whaley choosing to remain in Germany. While Hasselvander played on the entire album, his contribution was reduced to drums on five songs, with Paul Whaley re-recording the drum parts on the balance of the album.  This was because Whaley was set to rejoin the band and it was felt that he should contribute to the album, prior to touring.  The resulting CD, What Doesn't Kill You..., released in 2007, features contributions from both Whaley and Hasselvander as a consequence.

Blue Cheer's video for "Summertime Blues" made an appearance in 2005 documentary Metal: A Headbanger's Journey, where Geddy Lee of Rush referred to the group as one of the first heavy metal bands.

Death of Peterson and disbandment (2009)
On October 12, 2009, Peterson died in Germany after the development and spread of prostate cancer. After Peterson's death, longtime Blue Cheer guitarist Andrew MacDonald wrote on the group's website that "Blue Cheer is done. Out of respect for Dickie, Blue Cheer (will) never become a viable touring band again.". Under ten years later, in January 2019, drummer Paul Whaley died of heart failure.

Dispute over ownership of band name
In recent years, a dispute has arisen as to ownership of the Blue Cheer band name. It was reported that, as of the early 2000s (decade), former Blue Cheer guitarist Randy Holden, assisted by Randy Pratt of The Lizards band, had trademarked the Blue Cheer band name. Holden's association with Blue Cheer was quite brief; his only recorded output with the band is three tracks on New! Improved! from 1969. The matter had upset Dickie Peterson, given his position as a co-founder of the band and the only continuing member since its inception, but does not appear to have been resolved.

According to Randy Pratt, this report is not entirely accurate.  Pratt provides uncited commentary as follows:

Legacy 
Blue Cheer is often credited as one of the very earliest pioneers of heavy metal and their version of "Summertime Blues" has been cited as the first heavy metal song.
According to Tim Hills in his book, The Many Lives of the Crystal Ballroom, "Blue Cheer was the epitome of San Francisco psychedelia." Jim Morrison of The Doors characterized the group as "the single most powerful band I've ever seen" and Eric Clapton defined them as "probably the originators of heavy metal". Blue Cheer influenced such late 1970s bands as East-European psychedelic hardcore band Galloping Coroners.

Blue Cheer was also widely recognized as the loudest band ever at the time when they emerged. Billy Altman reported that at a 1968 concert the band was "So loud, in fact, that within just a few songs, much of the crowd in the front orchestra section was fleeing."

"Blue Cheer" was the name of a variety of LSD made by chemist and Grateful Dead patron Owsley Stanley and the band was probably named after that, although the name existed earlier, as the name of a laundry detergent after which the LSD variety itself was named.

Personnel

Members

Dickie Peterson – bass, vocals (1967–1972, 1974–1975, 1978–1979, 1984–1994, 1999–2009; died 2009)
Leigh Stephens – guitar (1967–1968, 2005)
Paul Whaley – drums (1967–1969, 1969, 1984–1985, 1990–1993, 1999–2004, 2005–2009; died 2019)
Eric Albronda – drums (1967)
Jerre Peterson – guitar (1967, 1974–1975; died 2002)
Vale Hamanaka – keyboards (1967)
Jere Whiting – vocals, harmonica (1967)
Randy Holden – guitar (1968–1969)
Mitch Mitchell – drums (1969) (died 2008)
Tom Weisser – guitar (1969)
Bruce Stephens – guitar, vocals (1969, died 2012)
Ralph Burns Kellogg – keyboards, bass (1969–1972; died 2003)
Norman Mayell – drums, guitar (1969–1972)
Gary Lee Yoder – guitar, vocals (1969–1972) (died 2021)
Troy Spence Jr. – guitar (1972–1974)
James L. Curry – drums (1972–1974)
Ruben De Fuentes – guitar (1974–1975, 1987–1988)
Terry Rae – drums (1974–1975)
Nick St. Nicholas – bass, vocals (1975)
Tony Rainier – guitar (1978–1979, 1984–1987)
Mike Fleck – drums (1978–1979)
Brent Harknett – drums (1985–1987)
Billy Carmassi – drums (1987)
Eric Davis – drums (1987–1988)
Andrew "Duck" MacDonald – guitar (1988–1990, 1999–2005, 2005–2009)
David Salce – drums (1988–1990)
Dieter Saller – guitar (1990–1994)
Gary Holland – drums (1993–1994)
Prairie Prince – drums (2005)
Joe Hasselvander – drums (2004–2005, 2009)

Lineups

Timeline

Discography

Studio albums

Singles

* The 2007 Japanese mini-LP sleeve reissue of Blue Cheer contains the mono non-LP single "All Night Long" b/w "Fortunes" along with the single versions of "Fool" and "Ain't That The Way" as bonus tracks.

Live
Blitzkrieg Over Nüremberg (1989; Thunderbolt/Nibelung Records)
Live & Unreleased, Vol. 1: '68/'74 (1996; Captain Trip Records)
Live & Unreleased, Vol. 2: Live at San Jose Civic Centre, 1968 & More (1998; Captain Trip Records)
Hello Tokyo, Bye Bye Osaka – Live in Japan 1999 (1999)
Rocks Europe CD/DVD, 2009; Rainman/Captain Trip Records)
Live at Anti Waa Festival 1989 CD/DVD, (2014; Nibelung Records)
Party Hard at the Underground Cologne (online only, 2017; Nibelung Records)
Three Giants, One Tour - Live in Germany in 1992 (online only, 2022; Nibelung Records)
Live Bootleg: London – Hamburg (bootleg/unofficial, 2005; Rockview Records)

Other releases
Motive  (1982; Philips)
Louder Than God: The Best Of Blue Cheer (1986; Rhino Records (2))
The History Of Blue Cheer – Good Times Are So Hard To Find (1988; Mercury)
Summertime Blues (compilation, 1990; PolyGram Special Products)
Vincebus Eruptum + Outsideinside (2003; Track Record)
Records Of Yesteryear (online only, 2005; Mercury)
Blue Cheer Rollin' Dem Bones (EP, 2008; Rainman)
7 (2012; ShroomAngel Records)
The '67 Demos (demo, 2018; BeatRocket)

See also
List of bands from the San Francisco Bay Area
Cheer (brand)

Book references

Other references

External links

 2007 Concert Video
 Leigh Stephens Official Website
 Video Interview of Blue Cheer by Serene Dominic

1967 establishments in California
2009 disestablishments in California
Acid rock music groups
American blues rock musical groups
Hard rock musical groups from California
Heavy metal musical groups from California
Musical groups from San Francisco
Musical groups established in 1967
Musical groups disestablished in 2009
People from Davis, California
Psychedelic rock music groups from California
Protopunk groups